Júlio Herculano Pedroso, known as Júlio Mazzei, was a Brazilian soccer coach. He is perhaps best known for bringing Pele to New York Cosmos of the North American Soccer League.

Era professor de Educação Física formado em São Carlos e foi preparador da equipe profissional do Santos Futebol Clube na década de 60. Estabeleceu novo tipo de treinamento no futebol, usando novos métodos, como o circuit training, criado em 1958.

Com o Santos ganhou os paulistas de 67, 68, 69 e 73, a Recopa de 68, o Robertão de 68 e conheceu 62 países do planeta.

Em 1965, foi preparador da Seleção Brasileira B.

He coached the Cosmos to the NASL title with a 1–0 victory over the Seattle Sounders in Soccer Bowl '82.

He died in 2009, aged 78.

References

Links 
 Michael Lewis: Passing of a Legend: Prof. Mazzei, confidante of Pele, former Cosmos coach, passes away, Big Apple Soccer, May 11, 2009.
 Júlio Mazzei: Ex-Professor de Educação Física, Que fim levou?, Terceiro Tempo, (per 30/10/2016). 
 Josmar F. Lopes: Julio Mazzei, the Cosmos and the Untold Story of the Man behind the Glasses, Reviews by Josmar Lopes, April 7, 2016.

Sportspeople from São Paulo
Brazilian footballers
Brazilian football managers
Brazilian expatriate sportspeople in the United States
Expatriate soccer managers in the United States
North American Soccer League (1968–1984) coaches
1930 births
2009 deaths
Association footballers not categorized by position